Claudia Villiger (born 25 September 1969) is a Swiss former competitive figure skater. She won bronze medals at the Nebelhorn Trophy, Golden Spin of Zagreb, and St. Ivel International, and became a three-time Swiss national champion (1985–87). Villiger placed sixth at the European Championships in 1986 and 1987. Her best placement at the World Championships was 13th in 1987.

Competitive highlights

References 

1969 births
Swiss female single skaters
Living people